Jeff Stevenson may refer to:
Jeff Stevenson (comedian) (born 1961), English comedian
Jeff Stevenson (rugby league) (1932–2007), English rugby league footballer